Affinity (1970) is the first album by Affinity, produced by John Anthony, with a cover design by Marcus Keef.

Track listing

Critical reception
On Allmusic, "Affinity" rates 4 out of 5 stars, and is described as "At times overambitious. And a plethora of cover versions given the progressive treatment instead of Affinity originals is a major letdown. But as an early work of post-'60s progression, this album is a pleasurable experience recalling the days when musicians and singers really worked hard at what they did."

Personnel
Affinity
 Linda Hoyle - vocals
 Lynton Naiff - Hammond B3 organ, piano, Wurlitzer electric piano, harpsichord, vibraphone, percussion
 Mo Foster - bass guitar, double bass, percussion
 Mike Jopp - electric, acoustic and 12-string guitars, percussion
 Grant Serpell - drums, percussion
Technical
Frank Owen, Robin Geoffrey Cable - engineer
Keith "Keef" MacMillan - album design, photography

References

External links
Affinity at Discogs.com

1970 debut albums
Vertigo Records albums
Affinity (band) albums
Albums produced by John Anthony (record producer)
Albums recorded at Trident Studios